Jacob Kramer (26 December 1892 – 4 February 1962) was a Russian Empire-born painter who spent all of his working life in England.

Early life
Jacob Kramer was born in the small town of Klintsy,  then belonged to Chernihiv hubernia of traditional Ukrainian lands, in 1892, then part of the Russian Empire, into an artistic middle-class Jewish family, who moved to Saint Petersburg shortly after. His father, Max, was a painter who had studied at the St Petersburg Fine Art Academy under Ilya Repin, and had become a court painter to Baron Günzburg. Kramer's mother, Cecilia, was also artistic being a trained singer who was well known for touring a regional network of theatres established by her father, at which she performed traditional Slavic and Hebrew folk songs. He had three sisters – Leah, Sarah and Millie – and a brother, Isaak. His sister Sarah married the painter William Roberts.

Life in England
In the anti-Jewish events following assassination of the Tsar the family, like many Jews decided to leave.  The father. Max, was in poor health so would not pass the health checks for admission to the US, so instead they came to England and settled in Leeds, which had an established Jewish population. When they arrived in the UK is not clear: they do not appear in the 1901 England and Wales census, but Jacob's sister Millie was born in Leeds in February 1904. After living for a short time in the Leylands they moved to a small  house in Beecroft Grove, Leopold Street, Chapeltown.

In 1902, aged only ten, Kramer ran away from his new home in Leeds, taking various jobs in different parts of the north of England, and even going away to sea for six months, being big for his age. During this sojourn away from his family Kramer attended occasional art classes, but his first formal art education was at Leeds School of Art where he had a scholarship from 1907 until 1913. During this time he was also to become involved in the radical modernist organisation the Leeds Arts Club, which introduced him to the ideas of expressionist artists, such as Wassily Kandinsky and the spiritual beliefs that came to underpin his work. Writing to his close friend and fellow Arts Club member Herbert Read in 1918, Kramer stated that when he looked at an object he saw both its physical appearance and its spiritual manifestation. His struggle, he claimed, was to escape the physical appearance and only paint the spiritual form. Such ideas came straight from the expressionist and Theosophical spiritualism that dominated the Leeds Arts Club, and show clearly that Kramer was himself an English Expressionist artist.

Slade School of Art and early career
With a scholarship from the Jewish Educational Aid Society, Kramer was able to study at the Slade School of Art from 1913 to 1914. Here be befriended other leading artists of the day, including Augustus John, David Bomberg and William Roberts, and he was involved in the Vorticist movement led by Roberts and Wyndham Lewis, although was never really a follower of the style. Nonetheless, several of his woodcuts did appear in the Vorticist literary magazine BLAST, and other periodicals including Colour, Rhythm and Art and Letters. In London Kramer rapidly became well known in the hedonistic artistic circles that dominated before the First World War and was to be seen frequently at well-known artistic haunts, including the cabaret-club The Cave of the Golden Calf, The Cafe Royal and The Tour Eiffel.

His first one-man show was in Bradford, and he had several exhibitions in London, as well as Glasgow and Leeds. He also gained a reputation as a portrait artist in addition to his more avant-garde work.

Leeds

Kramer was called up for military service in 1917, serving for two years including in France during the March 1918 campaign.
On completion of military service, he returned to Leeds where he became something of a local artistic celebrity. He was naturalised on 16 January 1922.

After the collapse of the Leeds Arts Club in 1923 he had numerous schemes to establish a new artistic meeting place in the city, almost all of which came to nothing. The great exception to this was the informal gathering called the Yorkshire Luncheon Club, which met regularly at Whitelock's Ale House in Leeds, and invited some of the leading cultural figures of the 1930s, 40s and 50s to Leeds to speak.

He became an established artist, and also taught at the Leeds School of Art. As a portrait painter, his sitters included Mahatma Gandhi and Frederick Delius

Kramer was commissioned to illustrate portions of the Soncino edition of the Bible and Prophets

He died 4 February 1962, unmarried and with no children, and was buried in the Jewish cemetery at Gildersome. A memorial service was held in Leeds City Art Gallery.

In 1968 Leeds School of Art was renamed Jacob Kramer College (it changed the name in 1993 to Leeds College of Art and Design).

His friend Jacob Epstein made a bust of him, copies of which can be found in the Tate in London and at Leeds City Art Gallery. The Tate, the Victoria & Albert Museum and the British Museum all hold examples of Kramer's work, but the most extensive collections can be found in Leeds at the Leeds City Art Gallery and Leeds University Art Gallery.

A small selection of personal material belonging to Jacob Kramer was donated to Leeds Central Library by his sister and nephew. The collection contains exhibition catalogues (including one signed by such well-known figures as Herbert Read); books belonging to Jacob; and a selection of photographs, including many of the wider Kramer family.

References

Further reading
Ben Uri Gallery and Museum (1984) Jacob Kramer Reassessed
Ben Uri Gallery and Museum (2003) The Tortoise and the Hare - Jacob Kramer & William Roberts
David Manson (2006) Jacob Kramer: Creativity and Loss Sansom  (Bristol)

External links

 10 artworks by Jacob Kramer at the Ben Uri site
 Jacob Epstein's bust of Kramer at the Tate
 Reproductions of Kramer's work
 Archival material at 

 Portraits by Jacob Kramer at the National Portrait Gallery, London.

20th-century English painters
English male painters
English Jews
Jewish painters
Alumni of the Slade School of Fine Art
1892 births
1962 deaths
Alumni of Leeds Arts University
20th-century English male artists
Emigrants from the Russian Empire to the United Kingdom